Keo Temple (Official name: Thần Quang Tự (神光寺)) is a Buddhist temple in Vũ Thư District, Thái Bình Province, Vietnam. The temple was commenced in 1061 under the Lý dynasty near the Red River.

The temple was dedicated in the 1130s to the monk Nguyễn Minh Không (:vi:Lý Quốc Sư) by emperor Lý Thần Tông after the monk cured his leprosy.

References

Buddhist temples in Vietnam
Buildings and structures in Thái Bình province